This Divided Island: Life, Death, and the Sri Lankan War is a book by Indian author and journalist, Samanth Subramanian, written as a non fiction account of the Sri Lankan Civil War.

The book received positive coverage for its depiction of the sectarian conflict between the Sri Lankan state and the Sri Lankan Tamils. The book was nominated for the Samuel Johnson Prize and the Royal Society of Literature's Ondaatje Prize. Writing in The Guardian, William Dalrymple, called it a remarkable and moving portrayal of the agonies of the conflict that "will stand as a fine literary monument against the government’s attempt at imposed forgetfulness".

See also 

 Sri Lankan Civil War in popular culture

References 

2015 non-fiction books
Indian non-fiction books
Sri Lankan Civil War books
Current affairs books
War crimes in the Sri Lankan Civil War
Penguin Books India books